Erythrolamprus fraseri is a species of snake in the family Colubridae. The species is found in  Ecuador and Peru.

References

Erythrolamprus
Reptiles of Ecuador
Reptiles of Peru
Reptiles described in 1894
Taxa named by George Albert Boulenger